Seasons: Rising is the fifth album released by Portuguese pop-rock singer David Fonseca. It was released in Portugal on 21 March 2012.

Track listing

References

2012 albums
David Fonseca albums